Thomas Monaghan may refer to:
 Thomas Monaghan (VC), British recipient of the Victoria Cross
 Thomas J. Monaghan (politician) (1914–1992), American politician
 Thomas J. Monaghan (attorney), American attorney
 Thomas Monaghan (hurler) (born 1997), Irish hurler
 Tom Monaghan (born 1937), American entrepreneur
 Tommy Monaghan, a fictional super powered Hitman in DC Comics